Robert Heslop (5 February 1907–1969) was an English footballer who played in the Football League for Gateshead and Nottingham Forest.

References

1907 births
1969 deaths
English footballers
Association football forwards
English Football League players
Annfield Plain F.C. players
Burnley F.C. players
Nottingham Forest F.C. players
Bishop Auckland F.C. players
Gateshead A.F.C. players
Bedlington United A.F.C. players